In enzymology, an isoflavone 3'-hydroxylase (Formerly ) is an enzyme that catalyzes the chemical reaction

formononetin + NADPH + H+ + O2  calycosin + NADP+ + H2O

The 4 substrates of this enzyme are formononetin, NADPH, H+, and O2, whereas its 3 products are calycosin, NADP+, and H2O.

This enzyme belongs to the family of oxidoreductases, specifically those acting on paired donors, with O2 as oxidant and incorporation or reduction of oxygen. The oxygen incorporated need not be derived from O2 with NADH or NADPH as one donor, and incorporation of one atom o oxygen into the other donor.  The systematic name of this enzyme class is formononetin,NADPH:oxygen oxidoreductase (3'-hydroxylating). This enzyme is also called isoflavone 3'-monooxygenase.  This enzyme participates in isoflavonoid biosynthesis.  It employs one cofactor, heme.

References 

 

EC 1.14.14
NADPH-dependent enzymes
Heme enzymes
Enzymes of unknown structure
Isoflavonoids metabolism